Adventure Travel (stylised as Adventuretravel; formerly NAT Group and New Adventure Travel) is a bus and coach company in South Wales. It is a subsidiary of ComfortDelGro.

History

Established in 2008 with four buses, Adventure Travel has now grown to have over 100 buses and coaches in its fleet from May 2020 - with most buses being second-hand from London.

Adventure Travel purchased Humphrey's Coaches of Pontypridd in 2011, and has since purchased the businesses of VR Travel of Merthyr Tydfil in October 2013 and Select Local Bus of Neath in 2015.

In February 2018 the business was purchased by ComfortDelGro. Adam Keen of Damory Coaches was appointed managing director of New Adventure Travel.

It was confirmed in late 2019 that the business is being progressively rebranded to Adventure Travel - with the coaching side of the business being rebranded to Adventure Coachlines.

In May 2020, Adventure Travel permanently ceased all operational work in mainland Europe due to COVID-19 pandemic, and is now focusing on its United Kingdom bus and coach services.

Routes 
Adventure Travel have won various routes in their operation, these include:

 Adventure Travel initially started bus routes in Cardiff city centre in 2013, operating tendered local services to Cardiff Council - however, when Crossgates Coaches (trading as Veolia Transport Cymru) ceased operation in the Pontypridd area, Adventure Travel quickly registered these lost routes - them being the 102, 103, 105, 106 and 108
 In August 2014, Adventure Travel were successful in its bid to operate the Gower Explorer buses, taking over from the former operator First Cymru on 26 October 2014.
 Adventure Travel also took over the T9 TrawsCymru route from Cardiff to Cardiff Airport from First Cymru. The T9 was run by Adventure Travel using Optare Tempo and was due to be replaced with Optare MetroCity, but the route T9 was cancelled before the Metrocity could see service.
 Adventure Travel run the TrawsCymru T6 between Swansea bus station and Brecon using branded Optare MetroCitys.
 In April 2018, Adventure Travel took on the running of the TrawsCymru T1C between Cardiff and Aberystwyth using a branded Mercedes-Benz Tourismo.
 Adventure Travel run the remaining Rail linc routes - them being the 901 between Blackwood Interchange and Ystrad Mynach railway station and the 905 between Rhoose Cardiff International Airport railway station and Cardiff Airport. However the 901 is currently being reviewed as part of Caerphilly County Borough Council's budget cut proposals.
 In August 2019, Adventure Travel was named the operator for five key bus routes in Swansea.
 On 10 June 2020, Adventure Travel announced it was to start operating the Severn Express. The route was branded as the X7 'TrawsHafren' and operated between Chepstow and Bristol via Cribbs Causeway. The route began on 15 June 2020, taking over from Stagecoach West and ran for a six-month trial period until 31 December 2020. It was run with Mercedes-Benz Citaro. As of 4 January 2021, the route is numbered T7 and is operated by Newport Bus.
On 29 June 2020, the G1 route covering Coryton, Gwaelod-y-Garth, Llandaff North, Tongwynlais, and Whitchurch was transferred to Fflecsi, a trial demand responsive transport service, where Adventure Travel operates the service in Cardiff, in partnership with Transport for Wales, and the local council.

Controversy
In May 2015 the company faced criticism for two adverts on the back of its route X1 buses which showed a scantily clad woman and man holding a placard saying "Ride me all day for £3". Adventure Travel said that the advertising campaign had been a "tongue-in-cheek" effort to target the younger generation and no offence had been intended, but that due to the volume of complaints, it would remove the adverts immediately.

In March 2019, Adventure Travel was fined £17,550 for buses not running to registered timetables. The company also had 4 buses taken off the road due to them having defects. ComfortDelGro claimed this was due to staff shortages, and the company have since implemented new software with better monitors to make sure routes run the schedule.

2019 saw residents of Thornhill, Cardiff rebel against Adventure Travel's X8 service. The route has since been amended.

Fleet

As of July 2020, Adventure Travel operated around 120 vehicles out of depots in Cardiff, Pontypridd and Swansea. The bus service fleet mainly consists of second-hand vehicles, either from London operators or their sister company, Metroline. The group also previously operated older vehicles like Alexander ALX400 and Plaxton President, but due to the fleet standardisation program they have all been retired.

Adventure Travel currently, as of May 2020, operate the following vehicles in their bus service fleet:

 Optare MetroCity - mainly new, some purchased from GHA Coaches. Many of these Metrocities are used on TrawsCymru route T6. Unlike other TrawsCymru vehicles in Wales, the TrawsCymru T6 vehicles are not leased from Welsh Government but are owned by Adventure Travel themselves as they are painted and maintained in-house at the group's depot in Swansea. Another 5 Metrocities are due to operate the TrawsCymru T9.
 Alexander Dennis Enviro200 - mainly new, long wheelbase versions are transferred from Metroline. One of these Enviro200's are used on TrawsCymru route T6. Another one of these Enviro200's, a short wheelbase version, is used on the Rail linc 901. 
 Optare Solo SR - all new to the company. 2 hybrids variants bought from Reays.
 MAN Citysmart - all new to the company
 MCV Evolution - all bought for the group's Newport depot, but have since been transferred to their Taffs Well depot.
Plaxton Centro - allocated to their Taffs Well depot.
 Mercedes-Benz Citaro - face lifts all new, older variants transferred from Quality Line
 Scania OmniLink - new to the company in January 2013
 Scania OmniCity - all started with other companies, such as Stagecoach London
 Alexander Dennis Enviro400 - all transferred from Metroline. These are in red livery for dedicated school services.
 Alexander Dennis Enviro300 - all started with other companies
 Mercedes-Benz Tourismo - transferred to the company following the demise of the Stansted Citylink service to operate on TrawsCymru route T1C.

Depots 

Adventure Travel's headquarters are at Coaster Place in Cardiff. However, the company also operate depots at Taff's Well (Pontypridd) and Swansea. The group have also previously operated depots at the following locations:

Newport Depot 
Adventure Travel previously ran a number of commercial services to compete with Newport Bus after Adventure Travel won their school services, enabling them to run bus routes off the back of them.

Subsequently, Adventure Travel withdrew from Newport and closed its Newport depot. The only Adventure Travel routes that remain in Newport are the R1 between Newport bus station and Risca, and the Sainsbury's Free Bus - both these routes are run by the group's Cardiff depot.

Skewen 
Following the purchase of Select Local Bus of Neath, Adventure Travel ran a number of ex-Select routes and vehicles from this depot.

Adventure Travel has now largely withdrawn from Neath and only provides limited services.

Abercrave 
Adventure Travel purchased the Abercrave depot when Crossgates Coaches ceased trading. The depot was used for storage but was sold and is now closed.

References

External links
Company website

Bus operators in Wales
Bus transport in Cardiff
Transport companies established in 2008
2008 establishments in Wales